Adrian Popa (born 7 April 1990) is a Romanian former footballer who played as a defender for teams such as Dinamo București, CS Snagov, Universitatea Cluj, UB Conquense, RSD Alcalá or CS Afumați, among others.

Honours
CS Afumați
Liga III: 2020–21, 2021–22

External links

1990 births
Living people
Footballers from Bucharest
Romanian footballers
Romania under-21 international footballers
Association football defenders
Liga I players
Liga II players
Liga III players
CS Concordia Chiajna players
FC Universitatea Cluj players
FC Dinamo București players
CS Afumați players
AS Voința Snagov players
RSD Alcalá players
Romanian expatriate footballers
Expatriate footballers in Spain
Romanian expatriate sportspeople in Spain